Sue Essex (born 29 August 1945 in Cromford, Derbyshire) is a Welsh Labour politician who was the Member of the National Assembly for Wales for Cardiff North from 1999 to 2007. She was the Welsh Assembly Government Minister for Finance, Local Government and Public Services in the Second Assembly 2003-07 and retired at the 2007 election.

Brought up in Tottenham, she moved to South Wales in 1971.

A college lecturer by profession, Essex was a member of Cardiff City Council and instrumental in pushing a green agenda in the city. She became leader of the city council from 1994 to 1996. In 1995 she narrowly lost the contest to be Labour leader of the new unitary authority of the County Council of the City and County of Cardiff.

Essex was elected Labour Assembly Member for Cardiff North in the National Assembly for Wales's inaugural elections in 1999 (First Assembly), and appointed Minister for Environment, Transport and Planning in 2000. She became the Minister for Finance, Local Government and Public Services following the 2003 election.

She announced on 19 August 2005 that she would stand down at the 2007 National Assembly for Wales election. Although supporting Labour candidate Sophie Howe, she was succeeded by Conservative Jonathan Morgan.

References

 Profile on BBC Website September 1999

Offices held

1945 births
Living people
Councillors in Cardiff
Welsh Labour members of the Senedd
Wales AMs 1999–2003
Wales AMs 2003–2007
People from Tottenham
Members of the Welsh Assembly Government
Female members of the Senedd
Ministers for Finance of Wales
Female finance ministers
20th-century British women politicians
Women members of the Welsh Assembly Government
People from Cromford
Women councillors in Wales